Vesthimmerland Airfield , also known as Aars Airfield, is a recreational aerodrome located  northwest of Aars, a town in Vesthimmerland Municipality (Vesthimmerlands Kommune), North Denmark Region (Region Nordjylland), Denmark.

Facilities

References

External links
  Motorflyverklubben Vesthimmerland
  Vesthimmerland Flyveplads - EKVH (Aars)
 

Airports in Denmark
Transport in the North Jutland Region
Buildings and structures in the North Jutland Region